Yin-Yang was a Russian-Ukrainian pop group. The group was a finalist in the seventh season of the Russian project Star Factory. The group's producer was Konstantin Meladze.

Discography

References

Russian pop music groups
Ukrainian pop music groups
Fabrika Zvyozd
Musical groups established in 2007